Emoia loyaltiensis also known as Roux's emo skink or Loyalty Islands emoia, is a species of lizard in the family Scincidae. It is found in New Caledonia.

References

Emoia
Reptiles described in 1913
Taxa named by Jean Roux